San Ignacio Cerro Gordo is a municipality in Jalisco, Mexico. It was established by the Congress of the State of Jalisco, on 1 January 2007 out of Arandas. Decree Number 20371 was published in the Periódico Oficial El Estado de Jalisco, on 30 December 2003, three years before the creation of this municipality, to allow its municipal authorities to be elected by the citizens in the election of municipal presidents on 2 July 2006.

Government

Municipal presidents

References

Municipalities of Jalisco